JSC CRI Central Scientific Research Institute Burevestnik is a Russian arms industry company based in Nizhniy Novgorod, Russia. It is part of Uralvagonzavod.

Burevestnik is a major designer of artillery systems. Seventy percent of Burevestnik's work reportedly is now civil, with priority interest in the fields of ecology, agriculture, and the processing and preservation of agricultural produce. Burevestnik designed the 2S35 Koalitsiya-SV self-propelled gun, first unveiled during the 2015 Moscow Victory Day Parade.

References

External links
 Official website

Manufacturing companies of Russia
Companies based in Nizhny Novgorod
Uralvagonzavod
Ministry of the Defense Industry (Soviet Union)
Defence companies of the Soviet Union
Research institutes in the Soviet Union
Golden Idea national award winners